Daniel David (born 23 November 1972) is a Romanian academic. He is "Aaron T. Beck" professor of Clinical Psychology and Psychotherapy at the Babeș-Bolyai University, Cluj-Napoca. He was the head of the Department of Clinical Psychology and Psychotherapy of the Babeş-Bolyai University between 2007 and 2012. Daniel David is also an adjunct professor at Icahn School of Medicine at Mount Sinai and is the head of the Research Program at Albert Ellis Institute in New York.

In 2020, he was elected rector of Babeș-Bolyai University

Education
David was born in Satu Mare. In 1999 he obtained a Ph.D. degree in psychology from Babeș-Bolyai University with thesis Mecanisme inconștiente de reactualizare a informațiilor, under the direction of Ioan Radu.

National achievements
David created the first school of cognitive-behavioral therapy (CBT) in Romania, based on international principles, recognized as such by the founders of this field such as Albert Ellis and Aaron T. Beck; he and his trainee also extended the application of CBT in education (e.g., rational-emotive & cognitive-behavioral education) and organizational fields (e.g., cognitive-behavioral coaching). He is a Fellow in the Academy of Cognitive Therapy, U.S.A. and  the national representative in the Social Sciences Standing Committee at the European Science Foundation. He is among those who introduced in Romanian academic psychology the evolutionary psychology and genetic counseling as modern interdisciplinary approaches between psychology and biology. David reintroduced and up-dated the Retman concept, and is the coordinator of the team that created the comics, stories and cartoons with this character.

He has promoted the reform of Romanian clinical psychology and psychotherapy based on modern principles. Such a reform was necessary, taking into account that during the communist period of Romania both clinical psychology and psychotherapy were practically forbidden by the communist regime, and thus, the field was frozen in time. For example, after the communist era, Szondi and Lusher, among other projective test, were still commonly used for clinical testing. David, who studied in the U.S.A. for both his doctoral and postdoctoral studies, was one of the leaders of the first generations of psychologists after the anti-communist revolution of 1989, as since the 2000s, he has constantly been the most cited Romanian psychologist in the international literature. Given that he had several governmental and professional positions/leadership, he marked the reform of the clinical field in Romania, helping in moving the field from a '70s style approach to the modern one.  For his merits in research and education he was knighted in 2008 by the President of Romania, in the National Order of Knights for Merit. Also, for the advanced research programs that he has initiated, in 2014, together with other important contemporary researchers, he received the innovation award, part of the "Foreign Policy Romania" Gala. In November 2017, he has been elected as the president of the Romanian Association of Psychologists, association which has been inactive for several years. The goals for his mandate are to reestablish the association as a professional and scientific body supporting the development of the professional practice in Romania. In March 2020, he was elected as the Rector of Babeș-Bolyai University for a four years mandate.

International achievements
He has contributed to the assimilation of cognitive science principles in the clinical field. A more specific contribution was focused on developing the theory and practice of rational-emotive and cognitive-behavioral therapies (CBT/REBT), which brought him both the Aaron T. Beck Award and the Albert Ellis Award of the International Institute for the Advanced Study of Psychotherapy and Applied Mental Health. In 2004 he was invited as "Guest Editor" by the Journal of Clinical Psychology to organize a special issue titled: "Cognitive revolution in clinical psychology: Beyond the behavioral approach" in order to present the state-of-the-art regarding the impact of the cognitive revolution on the clinical field. As founding editor of the Journal of Cognitive and Behavioral Psychotherapies (abstracted: SSCI/Thomson ISI Web of Science; SCOPUS; PsycInfo; IBSS and full text: EBSCO; ProQuest), a Journal focused on evidence-based practice, he has supported the evidence-based approach in the clinical field. At this moment, is co-editor of the prestigious Journal of Rational-Emotive and Cognitive-Behavior Therapy. In 2013, the two research platforms, The SkyRa Platform for Clinical Cognitive Neurosciences and the PsyTech-Matrix Platform in Robotics/Robotherapy and Virtual Reality Psychotherapy, that he is coordinating as part of the International Institute for the Advanced Study of Psychotherapy and Applied Mental Health, have both been included in Mapping of the European Research Infrastructure Landscape (MERIL database).

Selected publications

David, D., Lynn, A., & Ellis, A. (Ed.) (2010). Rational and irrational beliefs in human functioning and disturbances; Implication for research, theory, and practice. New York: Oxford University Press.

David, D. (2003). Rational Emotive Behavior Therapy (REBT); The view of a cognitive psychologist. In W. Dryden (Ed.). Theoretical developments in REBT. London: Brunner/Routledge.

David, D., & Brown, R. (2003). The impact of different directed forgetting instructions on implicit and explicit memory: New evidence from a modified process dissociation procedure. Quarterly Journal of Experimental Psychology, 56A, 211–233.

References

External links
 Romanian Association of Cognitive and Behavioral Psychotherapies
 International Institute for the Advanced Studies of Psychotherapy and Applied Mental Health
 Journal of Evidence-Based Psychotherapies
 Major Books Publications
 Dr. Daniel David in conversation with Dr. Windy Dryden: REBT/CBT Research (audio file - Media Section)

1972 births
Living people
People from Satu Mare
Babeș-Bolyai University alumni
Academic staff of Babeș-Bolyai University
Cognitive scientists
Psychotherapists
Romanian psychologists
Romanian scientists